Kurds in Lebanon are people born in or residing in Lebanon who are of full or partial Kurdish origin. Estimates on the number of Kurds in Lebanon prior to 1985 were around 60,000. Today, there are tens of thousands of Kurds in Lebanon, mainly in Beirut.

History
Most Kurds in Lebanon have come in recent decades, but the Kurdish community of Lebanon dates back to the 12th century, when Lebanon was ruled by the Kurdish Ayyubid dynasty. The Ottomans also sent loyal Kurdish families to modern-day Syria and Lebanon, where they got administrative roles. These Kurdish groups settled in and ruled many areas of Lebanon for a long period of time.The first modern wave of Kurdish immigration to Lebanon was in the period of 1925-1950 when thousands of Kurds fled violence and poverty in Turkey. The second wave of Kurds entered in the late 1950s and early 1960s, most of whom fled from political repression in Syria and Turkey. During the early 1990s, the Lebanese government destroyed many squatter quarters in Beirut, where many Kurds lived, leading to the emigration of nearly one quarter of Lebanon's Kurdish population.

During the Lebanese Civil War, Kurds fought for  the Lebanese National Movement.

Current status
As of 2012, around 40% of all Kurds in Lebanon do not have Lebanese citizenship.

Notable People

Politician 

 Kamal Jumblatt, 20th-century Lebanese politician and author; founder of the Progressive Socialist Party
 Taymur Jumblatt, Lebanese politician
 Walid Jumblatt, Lebanese politician

Sports 

 Hassan Oumari, Footballer
 Joan Oumari, Footballer

Prominent families 

 Jumblatt family
 Sa'b family

See also
Kurdish diaspora
Turks in Lebanon
Syrians in Lebanon
Iranians in Lebanon

References

External links
The Kurds in Lebanon: a social and historical overview

Kurdistan Democratic Party Lebanon

Kurdish diaspora
Middle Eastern diaspora in Lebanon
Ethnic groups in Lebanon
Ethnic groups in the Middle East